Schneider (German for "tailor", literally "one who cuts", from the verb schneiden "to cut") is a very common surname in Germany. Alternative spellings include: Schneyder, Schnieder, Snyder, Snider, Sneider, Schnyder, Znaider, Schnaider, Schneiter, Shneider, and Sneijder, Snijder (Dutch), Snither (English), Snyman (Afrikaans), Schnider (Swiss German), Sznajder, Szneider (Polish), Snaider, Šnajder (Serbo-Croatian), and Schneidre (French).

Geographical distribution
As of 2014, 57.9% of all known bearers of the surname Schneider were residents of Germany (frequency 1:184), 18.8% of the United States (1:2,554), 6.1% of Brazil (1:4,446), 3.6% of Switzerland (1:299), 3.6% of France (1:2,452), 2.6% of Austria (1:443), 1.3% of Canada (1:3,837) and 1.0% of Argentina (1:5,820).

In Germany, the frequency of the surname was higher than national average (1:184) in the following states:
 1. Rhineland-Palatinate (1:96)
 2. Saarland (1:102)
 3. Hesse (1:123)
 4. Saxony (1:150)
 5. Baden-Württemberg (1:151)
 6. Thuringia (1:166)
 7. Bavaria (1:173)
 8. Brandenburg (1:178)

People

A–G
Alexander Schneider (1908–1993), classical musician
Amy Schneider, U.S. quiz game show contestant on Jeopardy!
Andrew Schneider (journalist), (1942–2017), American investigative journalist
Andy Schneider (born 1981), American ice hockey player
Anthony Schneider, (born 1933), Canadian ice hockey player and coach
Anthony Robin Schneider, bass from New Zealand
Athanasius Schneider, Auxiliary Bishop of Mary Most Holy in Astana
Attila Schneider(1955–2003), Hungarian chess master
Barbara Schneider, American playwright
Ben Ross Schneider, American professor
Bernd Schneider (chess player), German chess master
Bernd Schneider (footballer), German footballer
Bernd Schneider (racing driver), German racing driver
Bert Schneider, American film producer
Bert Schneider (boxer) (1897–1986), Canadian olympic boxer of the 1920s
Braden Schneider (born 2001), Canadian ice hockey player
Brian Schneider (born 1976), American baseball player
Camillo Karl Schneider (1876–1951), German botanist
Carl Schneider, psychiatrist
Carlos Eduardo Schneider (born 1988), Brazilian footballer, better known as Duda
Carsten Schneider (born 1976), German politician
Catherine Schneider, Canonized servant of the Romanov Family
Charles Schneider (disambiguation), several people
Christian Schneider (1887–1972), German industrialist
Christoph Schneider, drummer in the German band Rammstein
Cory Schneider (born 1986), American ice hockey player
Dan Schneider (baseball) (born 1942), American baseball player
Dan Schneider (TV producer) (born 1966), American actor, writer, producer
Dan Schneider (writer) (born 1965), American poet, writer, literary critic
David Schneider (disambiguation), several people
Dean Schneider, Swiss animal sanctuary founder and social media personality
Eddie August Schneider (1910–1940), American aviator
Édouard Schneider (1880–1960), French author
Edward Schneider (disambiguation), several people
Erich Schneider (1894–1980), German Iron Cross recipient in World Wars I and II
Eugène Schneider (1805–1875), French industrialist and politician
Ferdinand Schneider (1911–1984), German chemist
Florian Schneider-Esleben (born 1947), German musician, former member of Kraftwerk
Franz Schneider (chemist) (1812–1897), Austrian physician and chemist
Franz Schneider (engineer), Swiss engineer and aircraft designer
Fred Schneider, American vocalist
Fred B. Schneider (born 1953), American computer scientist
Gary Schneider (born 1954), South African-born American photographer
Georg Schneider (disambiguation), several people
George Schneider (disambiguation), several people
Georges Schneider (1925–1963), Swiss alpine skier

H–P
Hannah Schneider, (born 1982), Danish musician
Hannes Schneider (1890–1955), Austrian skiing pioneer
Helen Schneider, American vocalist and actress
Helge Schneider, (born 1955), German comedian and jazz musician
Henrik Schneider, Hungarian rower
Henry Schneider (1817–87) British industrialist and politician
Hortense Schneider (1833–1920), French operetta soprano
Inge Schneider-Gabriel, German rower
Jerry Neil Schneider (born c. 1951), entrepreneur and social engineer
Johann Gottlob Theaenus Schneider (1750–1822), German classical scholar and naturalist
Johann Rudolf Schneider (1804–1880), Swiss Dr. in medicine & politician, initiator of the Jura water correction
John Schneider (disambiguation), several people
John Brand Schneider, American engineer
Jörg Schneider (actor) (1935–2015), Swiss actor
Jörg Schneider (born 1964), German politician
Josef Schneider (disambiguation), several people
Juan Esnáider, Argentine footballer of German descent
J. Glenn Schneider (1935–2017), American educator and politician
Karl Schneider (activist) (1869–1945), German ophthalmologist, pacifist and anti-Nazi fighter
Karl Schneider (cricketer) (1905–1928), Australian cricketer
Kirk J. Schneider, American psychologist and psychotherapist
Kjell Schneider (born 1976), German beach volleyball player
Kurt Schneider (disambiguation), several people
Lars-Åke Schneider (born 1955), Swedish chess master
Ludwig Karl Eduard Schneider (1809–1899), German botanist and politician
Mac Schneider, American politician
Magda Schneider (1909–1996), German actress, mother of Romy Schneider
Maria Schneider (actress) (1952–2011), French actress
Maria Schneider (cartoonist), American writer and cartoonist for The Onion
Maria Schneider (musician) (born 1960), American conductor and composer
Liga Madara Schneider-Zegner (born 2007), Latvian
Matthew J. Schneider, United States District Attorney
Mathieu Schneider (born 1969), American professional hockey player
Max Schneider American Actor, Musician, Model and Dancer
Michael Schneider (disambiguation), several people
Nikolaus Schneider (born 1947), German Lutheran bishop
Oscar Schneider (born 1927), German politician (CSU), federal minister for construction
Patrick Schnieder (born 1968), German politician
Paul Schneider (disambiguation), several people
Peter Schneider (disambiguation), several people

R–Z
Reinhold Schneider (1903–1958), German author
Renate Schneider (born 1939), German artistic gymnast
René Schneider (1913–1970), Chilean general
Richard Schneider (1919–1982), German football manager
Rob Schneider (born 1963), comedian
Robert Schneider, musician
Robert Schneider (writer) (born 1961)
Roland Schneider, Swiss curler, 1975 World men's champion
Roman Schneider (1898-1967), German flying ace
Romy Schneider (1938–1982), actress, daughter of Magda Schneider
Ronnie Schneider (born 1943), American music manager
Rony Schneider, Israeli association football, coach and commentator
Sascha Schneider (1870–1927), German painter
Siegfried Schneider (disambiguation), several people
Simone Schneider, German operatic soprano
Stephen Schneider (scientist), US Stanford University climatologist and environmental biologist
Stephen Schneider (actor), American actor
Steve Schneider (American football), American football player
Steve Schneider (Branch Davidian), American Branch Davidian
Steve Schneider (computer scientist), British computer scientist
Tatjana Schneider, British architect and academic
Theodor Schneider, German mathematician
Tom Schneider (born 1992), Australian Rules Footballer
Tony F. Schneider (born 1917), US Navy pilot
Vreni Schneider, Swiss alpine skier
Willi Schneider (1903–1971), Austrian medium
Willi Schneider (skeleton racer) (born 1963), German skeleton racer
William Schneider (disambiguation), several people
Willy Schneider (1905–1989), German singer
Wolf Schneider (1925–2022), German journalist

Schneiders 
Abraham Louis Schneiders (1925–2020), Dutch writer and diplomat
Arlette Schneiders ( 1989), Luxembourg architect
Bernt Schneiders (born 1959), Dutch politician
Grace Schneiders-Howard (1869–1968), Surinamese politician
Lolita Schneiders (born 1931), American politician
Sandra M. Schneiders (born 1936), American academic
Toni Schneiders (1920–2006), German photographer

Schneyder 
Nathalie Schneyder (born 1968), American synchronised swimmer, Olympic champion
Werner Schneyder (1937–2019), Austrian cabaret performer, journalist, writer, actor, stage director, television presenter and sports reporter

Šnajder 
 Slobodan Šnajder (born 1948), Croatian writer and publicist
 Vera Šnajder (1904–1976, also known as V. Popovitch-Schneider), Bosnian mathematician
 Viktor Šnajder (1934–2014), Croatian sprinter

Sznajder 
 Andrew Sznajder (born 1967), English-born Canadian tennis player 
 Irena Sznajder (born 1977), Polish sprinter

Families
The Doll Family, a performing group of four midget siblings from Germany
Elly Annie "Tiny" Schneider (1914–2004)
Frieda A. "Gracie" Schneider (1899–1970)
Kurt Fritz "Harry" Schneider (1902–1985)
Hilda Emma "Daisy" Schneider (1907–1980)

Fictional characters
Dark Schneider (disambiguation), several characters
Karl Heinz Schneider from the manga Captain Tsubasa
Kyle Schneider, a character in the Metal Gear series
Dwayne Schneider, often simply Schneider, is a character portrayed by Pat Harrington on the American sitcom One Day at a Time
Friedrich Schneider, in the book Friedrich, by Hans Peter Richter
Coach Schneider from the movie A Nightmare on Elm Street

See also
 
 Schneider (taxonomic authority)

References 

German-language surnames
Jewish surnames
Occupational surnames